The Wellsville Red Sox were a minor league baseball team, based in Wellsville, New York. The team played in the Pennsylvania–Ontario–New York League, which is still in existence as the New York–Penn League.

History
The team began as the Wellsville Yankees, a class C affiliate of the New York Yankees from 1942 through 1946. In 1943, the team won its first league title.  After the 1946 season the Yankees ended their affiliation and were replaced by the Boston Red Sox and the team was renamed the Wellsville Nitros. The Nitros were kept their affiliation with Boston until 1949. However, for the 1949 season, the club continued to play as the Nitros.

In 1950 the Nitros changed their name to the Wellsville Senators when they became a farm team of the Charlotte Hornets in the Washington Senators' farm system. The team became the independent Wellsville Rockets in 1951 when their one-year affiliation with the Senators ended. In 1952, the Rockets were affiliated with the St. Louis Browns, before becoming the Wellsville Braves, an affiliate of the Milwaukee Braves. During their time as the Braves the team, won 3 league titles; in 1956, 1959 and 1960. In 1963 the team once again became an affiliate of the Boston Red Sox and took up the  Wellsville Red Sox name. In 1966, the Red Sox  moved the team from Wellsville to Oneonta, New York, under the ownership of Sam Nader the team became the Oneonta Red Sox. The club played in Oneonta until 2010, when they were relocated to Norwich, Connecticut, and continue to play as the Connecticut Tigers.

Year-by-year record

Notable alumni

Hall of Fame alumni

 Phil Niekro (1959) Inducted, 1997

Notable alumni

 Jerry Coleman (1942) MLB All-Star

 Tony Conigliaro (1963) MLB All-Star

 Elrod Hendricks (1960)

 Dick Littlefield (1947)

 Charlie Maxwell (1947) 2 x MLB All-Star

 Don McMahon (1950) MLB All-Star

 Don Nottebart (1954)

 Bill Robinson (1961)

 George Scott (1963) 8 X Gold Glove; 3 x MLB All-Star

 Jimmy Wasdell (1949-1950)

References
Baseball Reference Wellville, New York

Baseball teams established in 1942
Baseball teams disestablished in 1965
Defunct baseball teams in New York (state)
Defunct New York–Penn League teams
Boston Red Sox minor league affiliates
Milwaukee Braves minor league affiliates
New York Yankees minor league affiliates
St. Louis Browns minor league affiliates
Washington Senators minor league affiliates
1942 establishments in New York (state)
1965 disestablishments in New York (state)